Kaghani may refer to:
 something of, from, or related to the Kaghan Valley of northern Pakistan
 Kaghani, a dialect of Hindko spoken in the valley
 Kaghani (goat), a breed of goat

See also 
 Kaghan (disambiguation)